The first season of Argentine television series Bia was produced by Non Stop Producciones and Pegsa Group, and directed by Jorge Bechara and Daniel De Filippo, the season was first announced in August 2018 by Disney Channel Latin America. The season was first broadcast in Latin American on Disney Channel from 24 June 2019 to 8 November 2019 with a total of 60 episodes, divided into three parts of 20 episodes.


Cast

Main
 Isabela Souza as Beatriz "Bia" Urquiza
 Julio Peña as Manuel Quemola
 Guido Messina as Alex Gutiérrez
 Andrea de Alba as Carmín Laguardia
 Giulia Guerrini as Chiara Callegri
 Agustina Palma as Celeste Quinterro
 Micaela Díaz as Daisy Durant 
 Alan Madanes as Pietro Benedetto Jr.
 Luis Giraldo as Jhon Caballero 
 Julia Argüelles as Mara Morales
 Daniela Trujillo as Isabel "Pixie" Ocaranta
 Esteban Velásquez as Guillermo Ruiz
 Rodrigo Rumi as Marcos Golden
 Fernando Dente as Victor Gutiérrez
 Gabriella Di Grecco as Helena Urquiza / Ana
 Rhener Freitas as Thiago Kunst
 Jandino as himself
 Valentina González as Aillén
 Sergio Surraco as Antonio Gutiérrez
 Estela Ribeiro as Alice Urquiza
 Alejandro Botto as Mariano Urquiza
 Mariela Pizzo as Paula Gutiérrez

Recurring 
 Nicolás Domini as Lucas Gutiérrez
 Florencia Tassara as young Bia Urquiza
 Katja Martínez as Jasmin Carvajal
 Sebastián Sinnott as Charly
 Santiago Sapag as Milo
 Facundo Gambandé as Marcelo
 Simón Tobías as Hugo Landa "Indy House"
 Ana Carolina Valsagna as Florencia 
 Mirela Payret as Lucía Quemola 
 Nicole Luis as Soledad 
 Mariana Redi as Luciana
 Camila Vaccarini as Valeria
 Daniela Améndola as Chloe

Guest 
 Kevsho as himself
 Sebastián Villalobos as himself
 Daniela Calle as herself
 María José Garzón as herself
 Mario Ruiz as himself
 Mariano Muente as Claudio
 Ximena Palomino as Olivia
 Celeste Ianelli as herself
 Neira Mariel as Uma

Episodes

References 

Argentine television seasons